Attack of the 50 Foot Cheerleader is a 2012 American 3D science fiction comedy horror film directed by Kevin O'Neill and produced by Roger Corman as his first 3D production. The film stars Treat Williams, Sean Young, and Jena Sims. The film was released on August 25, 2012 on Epix.

Plot
Cassie Stratford is a plain science nerd, whose mother was captain of the cheer squad at Iron Coast University and president of Zeta Mu Sorority, so she is pressured to join both cheerleading and the sorority. However, Brittany Andrews, current Zeta President and Cheer Captain rejects her.

Cassie works in the Biology Building of the University, where she and her friend Kyle are working on a drug that turns things beautiful. In the night, Cassie steals the drug and injects herself with it. While she does become beautiful and makes the cheer squad when one of the cheerleaders is injured, she then discovers the drug has a side effect when she starts to grow taller and taller until she is a giantess.

Brittany discovers this and tries to seduce Kyle into telling her the secret, which leads to her being accidentally injected with more of the drug than Cassie and growing also. Brittany makes her way to the stadium.

Brittany enters the stadium where Cassie confronts Brittany which leads to a catfight, Cassie wins the fight by injecting Brittany with a drug overdose of the antidote before knocking her out. Kyle then injects Cassie with the antidote and she is returned to normal. While Cassie and Kyle kiss, Brittany is shrunken to dwarf size due to the overdose and is made fun of by her fellow cheerleading squad.

Cast

Production
Roger Corman stated that for each of the 350+ films he's produced, he has worked efficiently and planned them in advance.  He told the Toronto Star that he hoped to premiere the film at Comic-Con in July 2012. In a compliment he paid to the actress Sean Young, Corman told her, "Sean, you were great in the picture but you were miscast. You look too good to be the mother!" This was Corman's first 3D production. The actress in the title role, Jena Sims, was crowned Miss Georgia Teen USA 2007.

During filming, both Sims and Olivia Alexander heavily promoted the film, sharing behind the scenes photos with fans on Twitter and videos on YouTube. Sims and Alexander even accompanied Roger Corman at Comic-Con while wearing their giant cheerleader outfits and also accompanied Corman at the 85th Academy Awards.

The movie was featured in the 2013 book Crab Monsters, Teenage Cavemen, and Candy Stripe Nurses: Roger Corman: King of the B Movie by author Chris Nashawaty.

The song "Attack Attack", sung by Olivia Alexander, is featured during the opening credits of the film. Alexander wrote and sung three songs for the film: "Attack Attack", "It's On" and "VIP." A music video for "It's On" was filmed on August 9, 2012 and is available on Alexander's YouTube channel.

Release
The film premiered at San Diego Comic-Con on July 14, 2012.  It also screened at the 3D Film Festival on September 22, 2012. It was formally released on August 25, 2012 on Epix.

Lionsgate released the film on DVD in 2015 with no special features. There are currently no plans for a Blu-ray release making Attack of the 50 Foot Cheerleader one of the few films to receive a standard DVD release without a version available in the Blu-ray format.

References

External links
 

2010s science fiction films
American science fiction horror films
American comedy horror films
2010s English-language films
Films about size change
2012 comedy horror films
American independent films
American science fiction comedy films
Films about giants
Cheerleading films
2012 films
2012 independent films
Films produced by Roger Corman
Films directed by Kevin O'Neill (director)
2010s American films